In the United Kingdom, a staff grade doctor or dentist (now called SAS grades) is one who is appointed to a permanent position. Since 2008 this grade was closed and new appointees were called as specialty doctors/dentists. They will have been appointed into this position based on experience and their CV and not all doctors will have done post-graduate examinations to reach this position. In the past, staff grades could be promoted to Associate Specialists after several years of service and development by either interview and/or personal promotion. They may also apply to take up consultant posts through the GMC CESR route, or the GDC mediated entry route, which allows them to be registered on the specialist register after assessment of their experience. In order for a doctor to work as a SAS, they must have at least 6 years of experience. Their main duties may include:

 Ward rounds for inpatients.
 Two half-day or one full-day operating list per week.
 One or two outpatient clinics per week.
 Supervision of junior trainees.
 On-call as per rota.
 Review of emergency referrals.
 Emergency operating (when on-call)

Whilst historically they have been termed "NCCG" or "middle grade doctors", this is problematic and seen as a bullying and harassment term these days. The preferred term is SAS doctor.

The staff grade was closed to new entrants from 1 April 2008 when many in this grade moved to the new 'Specialty Doctors' grade. This move was optional and some staff grades remain in-post. Although they represent about 3% of the SAS workforce.

References

Healthcare occupations in the United Kingdom